The Egher is a right tributary of the river Racta in Romania. It flows into the Racta in Adrian.

References

Rivers of Romania
Rivers of Satu Mare County